Christian Reformed Church in South Africa is a confessional Calvinist denomination in South Africa. The Church is
a denominational member of World Reformed Fellowship.
The moderator is Rev. Sakkie Weber, the Vice Moderator is Rev. Johnnie Tromp.

Doctrine 
Three Forms of Unity
Belgic Confession
Heidelberg Catechism
Canons of Dort

Education 
 Christian Reformed Theological Seminary www.cgts.co.za

Demographics 
The denomination is present in 6 South African Provinces, these are:
 Eastern Cape Province (3 churches)
 Free State (1 church)
 Gauteng (8 church)
 Kwazulu Natal (4 church)
 Mpumalanga (1 church)
 Western Cape (5 church)
Approximately 32 churches belong to the Christian Reformed Church in South Africa

Interchurch organisations 
World Reformed Fellowship
The Evangelical Alliance of South Africa
Ministry partner of the church is Briarwood Presbyterian Church in Birmingham, AL

References

External links 
 Official website Christian Reformed Church in South Africa
 Christian Reformed Theological Seminary

Reformed denominations in Africa
Protestantism in South Africa
Members of the World Reformed Fellowship
1944 establishments in South Africa